Donald Ray Allen (born August 20, 1939) is a former professional American football fullback in the American Football League. He played college football at the University of Texas, and played professionally for the Denver Broncos in 1960.

See also
List of American Football League players

References

1939 births
Living people
People from Leon County, Texas
Players of American football from Texas
American football fullbacks
Texas Longhorns football players
Denver Broncos (AFL) players